Zamalek Sporting Club, commonly referred to as Zamalek, is an Egyptian sports club based in Cairo, Egypt. The club is mainly known for its professional football team, which currently plays in the Egyptian Premier League, the top tier of the Egyptian football league system. Since the foundation of the club in 1911, 22 different presidents ran the club. The first president of Zamalek SC is George Merzbach Bey, who is also the founder of the club. The longest-running president in the history of Zamalek SC is Mohammed Haidar Pasha, as he was the president of the club from 1923 to 1952, a total of 29 consecutive years.

List of presidents

This is a complete list of all club presidents in the history of Zamalek SC, from 1911 (foundation) until the present day.

Source:

Notes

References

Zamalek SC
Presidents